Coreura albicosta is a moth of the subfamily Arctiinae. It was described by Max Wilhelm Karl Draudt in 1915. It is found in Mexico.

References

Euchromiina
Moths described in 1915